Declana junctilinea is a species of moth in the family Geometridae. It is endemic to New Zealand. Adults of this species pollinate Dracophyllum acerosum and Leptospermum scoparium.

References

Moths of New Zealand
Moths described in 1865
Endemic fauna of New Zealand
Ennominae
Taxa named by Francis Walker (entomologist)
Endemic moths of New Zealand